A Dutch door (American English), stable door (British English), or half door (Hiberno-English), is a door divided in such a fashion that the bottom half may remain shut while the top half opens. They were known in early New England as double-hung doors. The initial purpose of this door design was to keep animals out of farmhouses or to keep children inside while allowing light and air to filter through the open top; essentially combining a door with a fairly large window.  When the top half was open they also allowed a breeze, but stopped the wind from blowing dirt into the house. This type of door was common in the Netherlands in the seventeenth century and appears in Dutch paintings of the period. They were also commonly found in the Dutch cultural areas of New York and New Jersey before the American Revolution.

Dutch doors are often used in North-American passenger train cars to allow crewmen to interact safely with other employees not aboard their trains (or simply to visually inspect their own train) without risking falling from the train. Recent operating rules changes in Canada have rendered the Dutch doors obsolete, although older rolling stock retains them.

Similar doors were once commonplace in Irish houses, called half-doors ( or comhla bheag). According to The Irish Times, "A traditional half-door is really a door and a half – a full door that opens inwards and a half door set to the front of the frame that opens outwards." They were designed to keep poultry and pigs from entering the house, as well as allowing air and sunlight into the usually dark and smoky cottages.

The term is also applied to the optional rear doors on some GM minivans vans and GM SUVs that have a flip-up rear window mounted above two half-size doors.

References

Doors
Dutch inventions